Red Ash is an unincorporated community and coal town located in Tazewell County, Virginia, United States. The community is located along VSR 804, which runs parallel to US 460 north of Raven, Virginia.

References

Unincorporated communities in Tazewell County, Virginia
Unincorporated communities in Virginia
Coal towns in Virginia